The 2012–13 Brunei Super League was the first season of the Brunei Super League. It was organized by the National Football Association of Brunei Darussalam and sponsored by DST Group.

Teams
 LLRC FT
 QAF FC (Brunei-Muara)
 Jerudong FC (Brunei-Muara)
 Indera FC (Brunei-Muara)
 MS ABDB (Tutong)
 Majra United FC (Brunei-Muara)
 Kilanas FC (Berakas)
 MS PDB
 Wijaya FC (Brunei-Muara)
 Najip FC

League standings

Results

References

External links
Brunei 2012/13, RSSSF.com
DST Group Brunei Premier League, FIFA.com

Brunei Super League seasons
Brunei
1
1